State Route 156 (SR 156) is a spur route of Tennessee State Route 56 (SR 56) and a state highway in Franklin and Marion counties in the southern central and southeastern portions of Tennessee, United States. It traverses the southern Cumberland Plateau before descending into the Sequatchie Valley, where follows the shores of Nickajack Lake for its final few miles.

Route description
SR 156 begins in Franklin County atop the western part of the Cumberland Plateau near Sewanee at an intersection with U.S. Route 41A/Tennessee State Route 15/SR 56. It winds its way southeastward across a remote section of the plateau, passing through Franklin State Forest along the way and crossing into Marion County after straddling the county line for a few miles. After exiting the forest, the road veers eastward and intersects Orme Mountain Road, a gravel road connecting the highway with Orme in the valley to the south.

It follows 2nd Street through the city's downtown area before briefly merging with the former route of U.S. Route 72/Tennessee State Route 27, veering north along Cedar Avenue for several blocks, and then turning eastward again to have an interchange with the current expressway alignment. SR 156 crosses the Tennessee River via the steel arch Shelby Rhinehart Bridge.

After crossing the bridge, SR 156 enters New Hope, which it traverses from west-to-east, providing its main traffic artery. Shortly after crossing the bridge, it intersects Tennessee State Route 422, which goes south to Long Island, Alabama. At this city's eastern limits, SR 156 intersects Tennessee State Route 377, which continues southward into Alabama (where it becomes Alabama State Route 73). Beyond this intersection, SR 156 crosses a mile-long causeway across Nickajack Lake, with the Nickajack Cove inlet to the south, and the main body of the lake to the north. The road runs parallel to a stretch of CSX railroad tracks along the length of the causeway.

After reaching the main lakeshore, SR 156 turns northeastward, following the shore and the lower slopes of Sand Mountain before reaching an intersection with Interstate 24 (Exit 161). Just past this intersection, the highway again crosses a section of the lake before terminating at its intersection with Tennessee State Route 134. From this point, SR 134 continues northward into Haletown and eastward toward Whiteside and the northwestern part of the state of Georgia.

Major intersections

See also

 List of state routes in Tennessee
 List of highways numbered 156

References

External links

156
Transportation in Marion County, Tennessee
Transportation in Franklin County, Tennessee